Bhardeu is a village and former Village Development Committee that is now part of Konjyosom Rural Municipality in Province No. 3 of central Nepal. At the time of the 1991 Nepal census it had a population of 1,746 in 310 individual households.

Bhardeu is a small village located in Lalitpur district, Bagmati zone Nepal. The people are mostly Tamang (apx.65%) and Newar (apx.25%). The main languages spoken are Tamang and Nepali. Most of the people raise crops and livestock. Foreign remittances are also economically significant.

Bhardeu VDC is 22 km south from ring-road Satdobato. There is also bus service from Pyangaun, Chapagaun or from Lagankhel up to LELE Saraswoti Kunda station.

References

External links

Populated places in Lalitpur District, Nepal